Traditional leaders play many roles in Zimbabwean communities, culture and families. They help to promote and uphold cultural values, facilitate development and resolving of disputes in their communities. The institution of traditional leadership is regulated and monitored within the parameters of the Constitution of Zimbabwe. These leaders are put in position by the government of Zimbabwe to work with the people. A chief is not elected into office by popular vote, but through lineage, and is thus in office for life.

See also
Zimbabwe Council of Chiefs

References

Further reading
 Alexander, Jocelyn, McGregor, JoAnn and Ranger, Terence, (2000) Violence and Memory: One Hundred Years in the ‘Dark Forests’ of Matabeleland, Oxford: James Currey, 2000
 Beach, David (1980) The Shona: 900–1850, Gweru: Mambo Press, 1980
 Bhebe, N and T. O. Ranger (eds) (1995) Society in Zimbabwe’s Liberation War, Volume Two, Harare: University of Zimbabwe Publications, 1995
 Bond, Patrick, and Manyanya, Masimba, (2002) Zimbabwe’s Plunge: Exhausted Nationalism, Neoliberalism and the Search for Social Justice, London: Merlin Press, 2002
 Bourdillon, M (1976) The Shona Peoples: Revised Edition, Gweru: Mambo Press, 1976
 Catholic Commission for Justice and Peace/Legal Resources Foundation, (1997) Breaking the Silence, Building True Peace. A Report on the Disturbances in Matabeleland and the Midlands 1980 to 1988, Harare, CCJP/LRF, 1997
 Chakaipa, Stephen (2010) Local Government Institutions And Elections, Local Government Working Paper Series No. 4 2010, Community Law Centre University of the Western Cape. Available at Local government reform in Zimbabwe
 Dzingirai, V (1994)  Politics And Ideology In Human Settlement - Getting Settled In The Sikomena Area Of Chief Dobola, Zambezia (1994), XXI (ii)
 Fontein, J (2004) “‘Traditional Connoisseurs’ of the Past: The Ambiguity of Spirit Mediums and the Performance of the Past in southern Zimbabwe” Occasional Paper No 99. Centre of African Studies, University of Edinburgh.
 Government of Zimbabwe (2012) Record of Chiefs in Zimbabwe as at 9 May 2012, Compiled by The Department of Traditional Leadership Support Services in the Ministry of Local Government, Rural and Urban Development
 Hammar, Amanda (2005) Disrupting Democracy? Altering Landscapes Of Local Government In Post-2000 Zimbabwe, Discussion Paper no.9, Crisis States Research Centre, available at https://web.archive.org/web/20140808043844/http://eprints.lse.ac.uk/28342/1/dp09
 Hammar, Amanda, Raftopoulos, Brian and Jensen, Stig (eds), (2003) Zimbabwe’s Unfinished Business: Rethinking Land, State and Nation in the Context of Crisis, Harare: Weaver Press, 2003
 Human Rights Watch (2003) ‘Zimbabwe. Not Eligible: The Politicization of Food in Zimbabwe', Human Rights Watch, 15:17A (October 2003) 
 Iliff, Andrew (2010) Root and Branch, Tree of Life - Sowing the Seeds of Grassroots Transitional Justice, Oxford Transitional Justice Research Working Paper Series Available at Root and Branch, Tree of Life: Sowing the Seeds of Grassroots Transitional Justice
 Kriger, Norma (2003) Guerrilla Veterans in Post-War Zimbabwe. Symbolic and Violent Politics, 1980–1987, Cambridge: Cambridge University Press, 2003
 Madzudzo, Elias (undated) Communal Tenure, Motivational Dynamics and Sustainable Wildlife
 Makumbe, John (1998) Democracy and Development in Zimbabwe: Constraints of Decentralisation, Harare: SAPES Books, 1998
 Makumbe, John (2010) Local Authorities And Traditional Leadership Local Government Working Paper Series No 2, Community Law Centre, Cape Town, available at Local government reform in Zimbabwe
 Matyszak, Derek (2011) Formal Structures Of Power In Rural Zimbabwe, Harare, RAU available at Formal structures of power in rural Zimbabwe
 Meredith, Martin (2002) Our Votes, Our Guns: Robert Mugabe and the Tragedy of Zimbabwe, Oxford: Public Affairs, 2002
 Peel, John D.Y. and Terence O. Ranger (eds) (1983) Past and Present in Zimbabwe, (Special Issue of Africa), Manchester: Manchester University Press, 1983, pp. 20–41
 Raftopoulos, Brian, and Phimister, Ian (2004) ‘Zimbabwe Now: The Political Economy of Crisis and Coercion’, Historical Materialism, 12:4 (2004)
 Ranger, Terence (1985) Peasant Consciousness and Guerilla War in Zimbabwe, London: James Currey, 1985
 Ranger, Terence (ed.) (2003) The Historical Dimensions of Democracy and Human Rights in Zimbabwe Volume Two: Nationalism, Democracy and Human Rights, Harare: University of Zimbabwe Publications, 2003
 Roe, Emery (1995) 'More Than the Politics of Decentralization: Local Government Reform, District Development and Public Administration in Zimbabwe’, World Development, 23:5 (1995), pp. 833–843
 Sicilia, Olga (2011) Oratory in Mhondoro ritual spaces in northern Zimbabwe ―Traditional authority, power relations and local political structures, University of Vienna
 Solidarity Peace Trust (2004) No War in Zimbabwe: An Account of the Exodus of a Nation’s People, Johannesburg: Solidarity Peace Trust, 2004
 Solidarity Peace Trust (2005) Subverting Justice: The Role of the Judiciary in Denying the Will of the Zimbabwe Electorate Since 2000, Johannesburg: Solidarity Peace Trust, 2005
 Vijfhuizen, Carin and Locadia Makora (1998) More Than One Paramount Chief in One Chieftaincy, Zambezia XXV(i) pp 59–81

Zimbabwean culture